Hochstall is a small village located in Bavaria, Germany. It is in Upper Franconia, in the Bamberg district. Hochstall is a constituent community of Buttenheim.

In 2010, the village had a population of 31.

Geography
The village is about 900 meters south of Kälberberg.

References

External links
 Contessa, Google Maps Photo - Bus Shelter at Entrance of Village, Accessed August 25, 2016. 
 Contessa, Google Maps Photo - Crucifix in Center of Village, Accessed August 25, 2016. 

Villages in Bavaria
Bamberg (district)